The binomial system is a voting system that was used in the legislative elections of Chile between 1989 and 2013. 

From an electoral system point of view, the binomial system is in effect the D'Hondt method with an open list where every constituency returns two (hence the name) representatives to the legislative body. The fact that only two candidates are elected in each district results in the peculiarity where the second most supported list is over-represented. Its use was prescribed in the respective constitutional organic law during the Pinochet regime.

The binomial system was invented in Poland in the 1980s under the Wojciech Jaruzelski regime, in order to foster political stability in the democratization process, maintaining the preeminence of the Polish United Workers' Party against the rise of the opposition movement Solidarity, being recognized as a system that promoted consensus and negotiation between opposing sides of government.

The binomial system was considered by most analysts as the main constitutional lock that prevented completion of the Chilean transition to democracy.

Characteristics 

The system works in the following manner: Parties and independent candidates group themselves into lists or coalitions, basically electoral blocs. Each list proposes up to two candidates per electoral region, province, or other geographical unit. Votes are first tallied by list instead of by candidate, and unless the list which obtained a majority has double the voting as the second most supported list, each of the two lists gets one of their candidates, the one who got the most voting, into office. In other words, the binomial system basically means that the first (absolute or relative majority i.e: plurality) and the second largest party get equal representation unless the majority doubles the second. For example, in the following cases the candidate that would get elected under a binomial system are marked with an [e]:

The most common case is Case 2, in which one list gets a total voting that is higher than the other but both get exactly the same number of candidates elected, candidates 1A and 2A respectively. In the unlikely case that both lists get exactly the same number of votes each gets a candidate into office. Only in the case that List 1 doubles the voting of List 2 will List 1 be able to get two seats, even if, like in Case 3, the second elected candidate of the most supported list received the fewest votes of all the candidates of the two majorities. The system makes it difficult for minority parties to elect candidates: in Case 4, candidate 3A receives the most votes, but under the binomial system, candidates 1A and 2A will be elected.

As can be seen, the binomial system acts to equalize the representation of the second largest party to the point of making it roughly equal, or only slightly smaller, than that of the party winning at least a plurality. Furthermore, it acts to exclude any minority from the process, in practice generating a locked two-party, or two-bloc, system in which it is exceedingly difficult for one of the blocs to get an upper hand on the other. The table below posits the electoral results of the 2005 lower chamber parliamentary elections with three different voting systems.

Rationale 

The binomial system, proponents argue, acts to stabilize the political situation by making it almost impossible for a single political bloc or coalition to make important choices in a one-sided manner. This in turn leads to great political stability and prevents the emergence of the long-term personality-centered populist regimes that have been common throughout the history of Latin America. It has also been argued that it fosters consensus-building, debate and negotiation. Finally the point of representation is often cited in defense of the binomial system, as it provides a representation to the big minority that first-past-the-post systems don't.

Criticism 

Critics of this system argue that it makes for a flawed democracy, as it does not necessarily elect the candidate who received the most votes. Furthermore, it effectively excludes the smaller political forces that are not a part of either of the two big electoral alliances.

References

Bibliography 
 Siavelis, Peter M.: La lógica oculta de la selección de candidatos en las elecciones parlamentarias chilenas", en Estudios Públicos, No.98 (2005), pp. 189-225.
 Von Baer, Ena: "Sistema Binomial: Consensos y disensos, en Reforma al Sistema Binomial chileno

Semi-proportional electoral systems
Politics of Chile
Polish inventions